General elections were held in Togo on 9 April 1961, alongside a constitutional referendum. It was the first time the President had been directly elected, and Prime Minister Sylvanus Olympio of the Party of Togolese Unity was the only candidate. He was elected unopposed, with the PUT won all 52 seats in the National Assembly. Voter turnout was 90.0%.

Results

President

National Assembly

References

Togo
General
Elections in Togo
Single-candidate elections
One-party elections
Presidential elections in Togo
Togo